Chemmaruthy  is a panchayat in Varkala Taluk of Thiruvananthapuram district in the state of Kerala, India. It is 7 km east of Varkala city centre and 40 km north of state capital Trivandrum. It is also one of the 5 panchayats that shares border with Varkala Municipality.

Demographics
 India census, Chemmaruthy had a population of 32444 with 14468 males and 16450 females.

References

Villages in Thiruvananthapuram district